Dike is an unincorporated community in Hopkins County, Texas, United States. Dike has a post office with the ZIP code 75437.

References

External links
 

Unincorporated communities in Hopkins County, Texas
Unincorporated communities in Texas